Heiden Kahira Bedwell-Curtis (born 25 June 1991) is a New Zealand rugby union player. He plays in the flanker position for Mitsubishi Sagamihara DynaBoars in the Japanese Top League.

He has international experience with the New Zealand national under-20 side.

Career

Taranaki 
Bedwell-Curtis played 2 matches for Taranaki in 2012, playing that season's first two Ranfurly Shield matches against King Country and Wanganui. He was contracted and made the Taranaki NPC squad, but broke his cheekbone playing for the development side which all but ruled him out for further appearances.

The uncertainty about whether or not he would be offered another contract with Taranaki had prompted Bedwell-Curtis to head to Manawatu on a one-year deal.

Manawatu 
In his debut season for Manawatu, Bedwell-Curtis snatched up the starting blindside flanker role for the Turbos. He was resigned for the 2016 Mitre 10 Cup season.

Hurricanes 
Bedwell-Curtis had been in and out of the Hurricanes Wider Training Group, but was not called up for the senior side.

Crusaders 
Bedwell-Curtis was called in to the Crusaders Super Rugby squad during 2017 and made 7 appearances his first season. After being released at the end of the 2017 season he was recalled the next year following further injury concerns within the team. Bedwell-Curtis added further to his tally of matches which included starting in the 2018 Super Rugby final win over the Lions.

References 

1991 births
New Zealand rugby union players
Taranaki rugby union players
Manawatu rugby union players
Rugby union flankers
Living people
Māori All Blacks players
People educated at New Plymouth Boys' High School
Rugby union players from Christchurch
Crusaders (rugby union) players
Hurricanes (rugby union) players
Mitsubishi Sagamihara DynaBoars players